Tranceport 3 is a DJ mix album released by Sandra Collins in 2000, third in the Tranceport series. It was released on Kinetic Records.

Track listing
"Liquid Sun (Cass & Slide Mix)" - Astral Projection
"F.U.B.A.R." - Think Tank
"Rush (Echo's Wave Dub)" - Bradley
"Desanitize" - Mara
"Boomerang (Original Mix)" - Dune
"Heaven (Feel An Extremity) (Chris Zippel Remix)" - Ultra Violet 
"Deeper Inside (Original Mix)" - Deep Cover
"I'm Not Existing (O. Lieb Main Mix)" - LSG
"Motion" - Voyager
"C'est Muzique (Armin van Buuren Remix)" - Shane
"Airwave (Original Mix)" - Rank 1

References

External links

2000 compilation albums
Techno compilation albums
Kinetic Records compilation albums